Keraniganj is an upazila of Dhaka District in the division of Dhaka, Bangladesh.

History 

It is believed that during the reign of Nawab Shaista Khan the paik-peyada and clerical staff (kerani) of the Nawab used to live on the other side of the river Buriganga. Keraniganj is named after this. Historically, it is believed that, after the regime change in 1757, Nawab Siraj ud-Daulah's wife and one of his aunts were in prison at Zinzira in Keraniganj. Strategically, Keraniganj played a vital role during the liberation war of Bangladesh (1971), specially in the guerilla warfare. Many of the guerilla operations in Dhaka city were planned and conducted from Keraniganj and, for this reason, it had to pay for this. The Pakistani army set fire to many houses in Konakhola, Basta, Brahmankirtha, Ghatarchar, Monohorea, Joynagar, Ramerkanda, Rohitpur, Poraati, Goalkhali and Khagail Kholamora villages. The Pakistani Army fired on many people at Zinzira on 2 April 1971. The freedom Fighters later conducted extensive guerilla attack on the Pakistani army and freed Keraniganj Upazila forever.

Geography 
The town of Keraniganj stands on the southwest side of Dhaka City on the bank of the Buriganga river. Keraniganj Upazila with an area of 166.87 km2, is bounded by Savar Upazila and Mohammadpur, Hazaribagh, Kamrangir Char, Lalbagh, Kotwali and Sutrapur Thanas to the northeast, Shyampur Thana and Narayanganj and Sadar Upazilas to the east, Serajdikhan Upazila to the south, and by Nawabganj and Singair Upazilas to the west. The main rivers are the Buriganga and Dhaleshwari. Keraniganj is connected to Dhaka Metropolitan through two modern bridge (Buriganga Bridge-2 and Bangladesh China friendship bridge which is also known as Burignaga Bridge-1) over Buriganga river. According to police administration, Keranigong is now divided into two thanas which are South Keraniganj and Keraniganj Model Thana, respectively. The Bangladesh government has a plan to integrate Keraniganj Upazila into Dhaka municipality in the near future, to accommodate the expansion of the capital.

Notable residents
 Mohammad Rafique, left arm spinner for the Bangladesh National Cricket Team, lives in the town of Aganagar, where he grew up.
Amanullah Aman, Presidium member of Bangladesh Nationalist Party  and the former State Minister of health and later labour and employment.
Nasrul Hamid, Awami League politician and  current State Minister for the Ministry of Power, Energy, and Mineral Resources of Bangladesh.

See also 
 Upazilas of Bangladesh
 Districts of Bangladesh
 Divisions of Bangladesh

References 

 
Upazilas of Dhaka District